Road curves are irregular bends in roads to bring a graduation change of direction. Similar curves are on railways and canals.

Curves provided in the horizontal plane are known as horizontal curves and are generally circular or parabolic. Curves provided in the vertical plane are known as vertical curve.

Five types of horizontal curves on roads and railways:
 Simple curve
 Compound curve
 Transition curve
 Reverse curve
 Deviation curve

Two types of vertical curves on roads:

 Valley curve
 Summit curve

Horizontal Curve

Simple curve

A simple curve has the same radius throughout and is a single arc of a circle, with two tangents meeting at the intersection (B in this diagram).

Compound curve

A compound curve has two or more simple curves with different radii that bend the same way and are on the same side of a common tangent. In this diagram, MN is the common tangent.

Reverse curve

Also called a serpentine curve, it is the reverse of a compound curve, and two simple curves bent in opposite directions are on opposite sides of the common tangent.

Deviation curve

A deviation curve is simply a combination of two reverse curves. It is used when it is necessary to deviate from a given straight path to avoid intervening obstructions such as a building, a body of water, or other significant site.

Transition curve 

Is a curve with a gradual change in elevation on the outside of the curve to help drivers comfortably take turns at faster speeds

Vertical road

Valley curve 
Also called a sag curve, this curve dips down and then rises back up. These are placed in the base of hills. The opposite of summit curve.

Summit curve 
Also called the crest curve, this curve rises and then dips down. At the peak of hills. The opposite of valley curve.

See also

 Geometric design of roads
 Hairpin turn
 Ranging rods
 Survey camp
 Tape (surveying)
 Transition curve

References

 

Surveying
Civil engineering